Hisarya (also known as Hisar, Hissar or Hissarya, formerly: Toplitsa) is a small resort town in Bulgaria, in Plovdiv Province.

Hisar means 'fort, castle' in Arabic. The word was adopted in Persian and Ottoman Turkish.

History

The town was founded thousands of years ago probably on account of its hot springs. Some pre-historic remains have been found in what is now the town centre. Later, it became a Thracian city and, when Thrace fell to the Romans and became a Roman province, Hisarya became a Roman town — one of the three most important towns in the province. At times it was called Augusta, Diocletianopolis (after emperor Diocletian), and a couple of other names. It was a famous resort even in those times, which is proved by the fact that emperor Septimius Severus visited the city.

Many Roman ruins are visible everywhere — public buildings, a small amphitheatre, the barracks of the Roman garrison, the foundations of a couple of the oldest churches in Bulgaria, as well as the best-preserved Roman city walls in Bulgaria. The southern gate is known as "The Camels", because it had broken in the middle and looked like two camels facing each other, before it was partially restored in the early 20th century.

After the fall of the Roman Empire, the prosperous city declined. When it was included within the borders of Bulgaria, it was just a minor fortified town. During the Turkish rule, it further declined and, at some point, the once-prosperous city was just a couple of small houses in the midst of many Roman ruins, which peasants from the nearby villages used for a stone quarry, destroying most of them in the process.

After the liberation of Bulgaria in 1878, Hisarya was included in the province of Eastern Rumelia; in 1908 it became a part of Bulgaria.

It prospered once again when the mineral springs were rediscovered and the place became a popular recreation spot.

After Bulgaria joined EU in 2007 various financing programs were used to recover the ancient ruins and renovate the park and street infrastructure, which recreates the town intensively and constantly and turns it again into a real gem of the Bulgarian spa, nature and historic heritage. The century-old trees in the parks, which are the habitat of numerous bird species, the renovated new modern large spa hotel centres with sport, spa and recreation areas and the brand new cosy luxurious smaller hotels and affordable guesthouses turn Hisarya again into a preferred resort for relaxation, health recovery, illness treatment and loved place for business seminars and events for foreign and Bulgarian visitors.

Honour
Hisarya Cove in Smith Island, South Shetland Islands is named after Hisarya.

References

External links

Towns in Bulgaria
Populated places in Plovdiv Province
Spa towns in Bulgaria
Roman towns and cities in Bulgaria